Hassan El-Kaissi (born 17 June 1968) is a Lebanese weightlifter. He competed at the 1988 Summer Olympics and the 1992 Summer Olympics.

References

1968 births
Living people
Lebanese male weightlifters
Olympic weightlifters of Lebanon
Weightlifters at the 1988 Summer Olympics
Weightlifters at the 1992 Summer Olympics
Place of birth missing (living people)
20th-century Lebanese people